Bevan John Lee  (born 7 November 1950) is an Australian writer and executive best known for creating the TV dramas All Saints, Packed to the Rafters, Winners & Losers and A Place to Call Home.

Career
Lee was an actor before turning to writing, working his way up to be script producer of the TV serial Sons and Daughters. He also rewrote the first episode of Home and Away, a show which he has script produced at various stages over the years. Lee was network script executive at Channel Nine for eight years in the 1990s before returning to Channel Seven, where he took part in the creation and development of such series as All Saints, Always Greener, Marshall Law and headLand, forming a notable creative partnership with Seven's head of network drama John Holmes. He created a new drama for Seven filmed in 2012, A Place to Call Home. He also created the critically acclaimed 2020 series, Between Two Worlds.

Personal life
Lee is gay and in 2007 he was nominated as one of the 25 most influential lesbian and gay people in Australia by online digital media site SameSame.

Filmography

Television 
The numbers in writing credits refer to the number of episodes.

Acting credits

Film

Television

References

External links

Bevan Lee at Screen Australia

Australian screenwriters
Australian LGBT screenwriters
Australian gay actors
Australian gay writers
Living people
Australian soap opera writers
Australian male television writers
Recipients of the Medal of the Order of Australia
1950 births
Australian television producers
People from Western Australia
21st-century LGBT people